Great Australian Bight Marine Park (Commonwealth Waters) is a former marine protected area located in the Great Australian Bight immediately south of South Australia and its immediate onshore waters.  On 8 November 2012, it was replaced by a new protected area known as the Great Australian Bight Commonwealth Marine Reserve.

See also
 Protected areas of Australia
 Great Australian Bight Marine National Park

References

Marine parks of Australia
Former protected areas of the Australian government
Protected areas established in 1998
Protected areas disestablished in 2012